Richard Vaughn is the name of:

 Ricky Vaughn, character in Major League

See also
Richard Vaughan (disambiguation)
Dick Vaughn, musician